Mirmostafa Javadi Aliabadi (born 22 June 2000) is an Iranian weightlifter who won a silver medal at the 2021 World Championships.

Major results

References

External links

Living people
2000 births
Iranian male weightlifters
World Weightlifting Championships medalists
21st-century Iranian people
Islamic Solidarity Games competitors for Iran